is a passenger railway station in located in the city of Suzuka, Mie Prefecture, Japan, operated by Central Japan Railway Company (JR Tōkai).

Lines
Kasado Station is served by the Kansai Main Line, and is 50.9 rail kilometers from the terminus of the line at Nagoya Station.

Station layout
The station consists of one island platform and one side platform, connected by a footbridge.

Platform

Adjacent stations

History
It was renamed Kasado Station on February 1, 1902. The Kansai Railway was nationalized on October 1, 1907 becoming part of the Japanese Government Railways (JGR). The JGR became the Japanese National Railways (JNR) after World War II. The station was absorbed into the JR Central network upon the privatization of the JNR on April 1, 1987. The station has been unattended since October 1, 2012.

Station numbering was introduced to the section of the Kansai Main Line operated JR Central in March 2018; Kasado Station was assigned station number CI15.

Passenger statistics
In fiscal 2019, the station was used by an average of 631 passengers daily (boarding passengers only).

Surrounding area
Japan National Route 1 
Suzuka River
Shōno-juku

See also
 List of railway stations in Japan

References

External links

Railway stations in Japan opened in 1892
Railway stations in Mie Prefecture
Suzuka, Mie